The 2002–03 NBA season was the Pacers' 27th season in the National Basketball Association, and 36th season as a franchise. During the off-season, the Pacers signed free agent Erick Strickland. Despite a rash of early-season injuries, the Pacers got off to a fast start winning 14 of their first 16 games, posting a nine-game winning streak in November, and holding a 34–15 record at the All-Star break. However, the team struggled losing 12 of 13 games between February 16 and March 12. In March, the team signed free agent All-Star point guard Tim Hardaway. The Pacers finished second in the Central Division with a 48–34 record.

Head coach Isiah Thomas, Jermaine O'Neal and Brad Miller represented the Eastern Conference during the 2003 NBA All-Star Game. That game was perhaps known as a storybook ending for Michael Jordan, but O'Neal ruined the moment, fouling Western Conference All-Star Kobe Bryant, who attempted a 3-pointer. Bryant hit 2 of 3 free throws to send the game into overtime. The West won 155–145 in double overtime. O'Neal averaged 20.8 points, 10.3 rebounds and 2.3 blocks per game, and was named to the All-NBA Third Team, while Ron Artest averaged 15.5 points, 5.2 rebounds and 2.3 steals per game, and was named to the NBA All-Defensive Second Team, and finished in second place in Defensive Player of the Year voting. In addition, Brad Miller provided the team with 13.1 points and 8.3 rebounds per game, while Reggie Miller contributed 12.6 points per game, sixth man Al Harrington provided with 12.2 points and 6.2 rebounds per game, and second-year guard Jamaal Tinsley averaged 7.8 points, 7.5 assists and 1.7 steals per game.

In the Eastern Conference First Round of the playoffs, the Pacers lost in six games to the 6th-seeded Boston Celtics. After the season, it was announced that Thomas would not be returning as head coach, replacing him with Rick Carlisle for the next season. Thomas would later return to coach the New York Knicks in 2006. Also following the season, Brad Miller was traded to the Sacramento Kings, while Ron Mercer was dealt to the San Antonio Spurs, Strickland signed as a free agent with the Milwaukee Bucks, and Hardaway retired after thirteen seasons in the NBA.

One notable highlight of the season was the Pacers defeating the Chicago Bulls, 140–89 at the Conseco Fieldhouse on March 28, 2003.

Offseason

Draft picks

Roster

Note
Bold = All-Star selection

Regular season

Season standings

z – clinched division title
y – clinched division title
x – clinched playoff spot

Record vs. opponents

Game log

Playoffs

|- align="center" bgcolor="#ffcccc"
| 1
| April 19
| Boston
| L 100–103
| Ron Artest (26)
| Jermaine O'Neal (9)
| Jamaal Tinsley (9)
| Conseco Fieldhouse16,380
| 0–1
|- align="center" bgcolor="#ccffcc"
| 2
| April 21
| Boston
| W 89–77
| Jermaine O'Neal (23)
| Jermaine O'Neal (20)
| Jamaal Tinsley (7)
| Conseco Fieldhouse15,881
| 1–1
|- align="center" bgcolor="#ffcccc"
| 3
| April 24
| @ Boston
| L 83–101
| Jermaine O'Neal (21)
| Jermaine O'Neal (16)
| Jamaal Tinsley (8)
| FleetCenter18,624
| 1–2
|- align="center" bgcolor="#ffcccc"
| 4
| April 27
| @ Boston
| L 92–102
| Jermaine O'Neal (25)
| Jermaine O'Neal (19)
| Jamaal Tinsley (13)
| FleetCenter18,624
| 1–3
|- align="center" bgcolor="#ccffcc"
| 5
| April 29
| Boston
| W 93–88 (OT)
| Ron Artest (26)
| Jermaine O'Neal (22)
| Tim Hardaway (6)
| Conseco Fieldhouse15,326
| 2–3
|- align="center" bgcolor="#ffcccc"
| 6
| May 1
| @ Boston
| L 90–110
| Jermaine O'Neal (25)
| Jermaine O'Neal (19)
| Erick Strickland (5)
| FleetCenter18,624
| 2–4
|-

Player statistics

Season

Playoffs

Player Statistics Citation:

Awards and records
 Isiah Thomas, List of NBA All-Star Game head coaches
 Jermaine O'Neal, NBA All-Star Game
 Brad Miller, NBA All-Star Game
 Jermaine O'Neal, All-NBA Third Team
 Ron Artest, NBA All-Defensive Second Team

Transactions

References

See also
 2002–03 NBA season

Indiana Pacers seasons
Pace
Pace
Indiana